The following is a list of episodes for the British comedy panel show Would I Lie to You?, which was first broadcast on 16 June 2007. As of 17 February 2023, 138 regular episodes (including 10 Christmas specials) and 18 clip shows have been broadcast across sixteen series; 156 episodes in total (not including the 2011 Comic Relief or 2016 Children in Need specials). The Series 2 & 3 clip shows consisted of a mix of new and previously seen footage; beginning with the fourth series, the clip shows were made up entirely of new material (although some later series also included an additional episode of the best previously broadcast footage).

All episodes are approximately 30 minutes long, and feature team captains Lee Mack and David Mitchell (with the exception of a series 8 episode where Mack was unable to attend the recording and his place was taken by Greg Davies), accompanied by two celebrity guests each. The first two series were hosted by Angus Deayton; he was replaced by Rob Brydon from the third series onwards.


Episode list
The coloured backgrounds denote the result of each of the shows:
 – indicates David's team won.
 – indicates Lee's team won.
 – indicates the game ended in a draw.
Bold type – indicates Rob's individual liar of the week (used from series 3 to 9).

Series 1 (2007)

Series 2 (2008)

Series 3 (2009)

Series 4 (2010)

Comic Relief special (2011)

Series 5 (2011)

Series 6 (2012)

Series 7 (2013)

Series 8 (2014–15)

Series 9 (2015–16)

Series 10 (2016)

Children in Need special (2016)

Series 11 (2017–18)

Series 12 (2018–19)

Series 13 (2019–20)

Series 14 (2020–21)

Series 15 (2021–22)

Series 16 (2022–23)

Scores

Footnotes

References

External links

Lists of British comedy television series episodes
Lists of British non-fiction television series episodes